Dogwood Acres, North Carolina may refer to:
Dogwood Acres, Alamance County, North Carolina
Dogwood Acres, Cumberland County, North Carolina
Dogwood Acres, Orange County, North Carolina
Dogwood Acres, Rowan County, North Carolina
Dogwood Acres, Union County, North Carolina